Rhinella achavali is a species of toads in the family Bufonidae that is found in Uruguay and southernmost Brazil (Rio Grande do Sul).

Rhinella achavali are found in or near small forest streams. It is locally common but its habitat is threatened by plantations of exotic wood species.

References

achavali
Amphibians described in 2004
Amphibians of Brazil
Amphibians of Uruguay